The construction of mosques in Malaysia has been documented since the influx of Arab, Chinese and Indian traders. Islam is the majority religion in Malaysia. In 2013, there were around 19.5 million population Muslim, or 61.3% of the total population of Malaysia. This list contains famous mosques in Malaysia.

See also

 Islam in Malaysia
 Lists of mosques

Author
Shabbir Rifat

References

!
Malaysia
Mosques
Mosques